Corpo de Bombeiros may refer to:
 Brazil
 Firefighters Corps of Acre State
 Firefighters Corps of Paraná State
 Military Firefighters Corps
 China
 Fire Services Bureau (Macau)